Michal Gašparík (born 19 December 1981) is a former Slovak footballer and currently a manager of Spartak Trnava.

Playing career
In January 2011, he joined Górnik Zabrze.

Managerial career
Gašparík became a first-team manager of Spartak Trnava in January 2021, signing a three-year contract.

Personal life
His father, Michal Gašparík, was also a footballer.

Honours

Manager
Spartak Trnava
Slovak Cup (1): 2021–22

References

External links
 
 
 Guardian Football

1981 births
Living people
Sportspeople from Trnava
Slovak footballers
Slovak expatriate footballers
Slovak football managers
Association football midfielders
FC Spartak Trnava players
FC Senec players
FK Teplice players
FK Baník Most players
Górnik Zabrze players
FC DAC 1904 Dunajská Streda players
MFK Skalica players
FK Iskra Borčice players
TJ OFC Gabčíkovo players
Slovak Super Liga players
Czech First League players
Ekstraklasa players
3. Liga (Slovakia) players
Expatriate footballers in the Czech Republic
Slovak expatriate sportspeople in the Czech Republic
Expatriate footballers in Poland
Slovak expatriate sportspeople in Poland
Expatriate footballers in Austria
Slovak expatriate sportspeople in Austria